Abs  (عبس) is a town on the coastal plain of Abs District, Hajjah Governorate, Yemen. In 2005 it had a population of 25,763 inhabitants and is the 24th largest town in Yemen. 

The city has been heavily affected by the Yemen Civil War. On 11 June, 2018, a cholera treatment facility, operated by Doctors without Borders to counter the country's cholera outbreak, was bombed by the Saudi-led coalition.

Climate
In Abs, the climate is hot and dry. Most rain falls in the winter. The Köppen-Geiger climate classification is Bwh. About  of precipitation falls annually.

References
   

Hajjah Governorate